Romanesque Revival (or Neo-Romanesque) is a style of building employed beginning in the mid-19th century inspired by the 11th- and 12th-century Romanesque architecture. Unlike the historic Romanesque style, Romanesque Revival buildings tended to feature more simplified arches and windows than their historic counterparts.

An early variety of Romanesque Revival style known as Rundbogenstil ("Round-arched style") was popular in German lands and in the German diaspora beginning in the 1830s. By far the most prominent and influential American architect working in a free "Romanesque" manner was Henry Hobson Richardson. In the United States, the style derived from examples set by him are termed Richardsonian Romanesque, of which not all are Romanesque Revival.

Romanesque Revival is also sometimes referred to as the "Norman style" or "Lombard style", particularly in works published during the 19th century after variations of historic Romanesque that were developed by the Normans in England and by the Italians in Lombardy, respectively. Like its influencing Romanesque style, the Romanesque Revival style was widely used for churches, and occasionally for synagogues such as the New Synagogue of Strasbourg built in 1898, and the Congregation Emanu-El of New York built in 1929. The style was quite popular for university campuses in the late 19th and early 20th century, especially in the United States and Canada; well known examples can be found at the University of California, Los Angeles, University of Southern California, Tulane University, University of Denver, University of Toronto, and Wayne State University.

The Romanesque Revival or Norman Revival in Great Britain

The development of the Norman revival style took place over a long time in the British Isles, starting with Inigo Jones's refenestration of the White Tower of the Tower of London in 1637–38 and work at Windsor Castle by Hugh May for King Charles II, but this was little more than restoration work. In the 18th century, the use of round arched windows was thought of as being Saxon rather than Norman, and examples of buildings with round arched windows include Shirburn Castle in Oxfordshire, Wentworth in Yorkshire, and Enmore Castle in Somerset. In Scotland the style started to emerge with the Duke of Argyl's castle at Inverary, started in 1744, and castles by Robert Adam at Culzean (1771), Oxenfoord (1780–82), Dalquharran, (1782–85) and Seton Palace, 1792. In England James Wyatt used round arched windows at Sandleford Priory, Berkshire, in 1780–89 and the Duke of Norfolk started to rebuild Arundel Castle, while Eastnor Castle in Herefordshire was built by Robert Smirke between 1812 and 1820.

At this point, the Norman Revival became a recognisable architectural style. In 1817, Thomas Rickman published his An Attempt to Discriminate the Styles of English Architecture from the Conquest To the Reformation. It was now realised that 'round-arch architecture' was largely Romanesque in the British Isles and came to be described as Norman rather than Saxon. The start of an "archaeologically correct" Norman Revival can be recognised in the architecture of Thomas Hopper. His first attempt at this style was at Gosford Castle in Armagh in Ireland, but far more successful was his Penrhyn Castle near Bangor in North Wales. This was built for the Pennant family, between 1820 and 1837. The style did not catch on for domestic buildings, though many country houses and mock castles were built in the Castle Gothic or Castellated style during the Victorian period, which was a mixed Gothic style.

However, the Norman Revival did catch on for church architecture. Thomas Penson, a Welsh architect, would have been familiar with Hopper's work at Penrhyn, who developed Romanesque Revival church architecture. Penson was influenced by French and Belgian Romanesque Revival architecture, and particularly the earlier Romanesque phase of German Brick Gothic. At St David's Newtown, 1843–47, and St Agatha's Llanymynech, 1845, he copied the tower of St. Salvator's Cathedral, Bruges. Other examples of Romanesque revival by Penson are Christ Church, Welshpool, 1839–1844, and the porch to Langedwyn Church. He was an innovator in his use of Terracotta to produce decorative Romanesque mouldings, saving on the expense of stonework. Penson's last church in the Romanesque Revival style was Rhosllannerchrugog, Wrexham, 1852.

The Romanesque adopted by Penson contrasts with the Italianate Romanesque of other architects such as Thomas Henry Wyatt, who designed Saint Mary and Saint Nicholas Church, in this style at Wilton, which was built between 1841 and 1844 for the Dowager Countess of Pembroke and her son, Lord Herbert of Lea. During the 19th century, the architecture selected for Anglican churches depended on the churchmanship of particular congregations. Whereas high churches and Anglo-Catholic, which were influenced by the Oxford Movement, were built in Gothic Revival architecture, low churches and broad churches of the period were often built in the Romanesque Revival style. Some of the later examples of this Romanesque Revival architecture is seen in Non-conformist or Dissenting churches and chapels. A good example of this is by the Lincoln architects Drury and Mortimer, who designed the Mint Lane Baptist Chapel in Lincoln in a debased Italianate Romanesque revival style in 1870. After about 1870 this style of Church architecture in Britain disappears, but in the early 20th century, the style is succeeded by Byzantine Revival architecture.

Canada

Two of Canada's provincial legislatures, the Ontario Legislative Building in Toronto and the British Columbia Parliament Buildings in Victoria, are Romanesque Revival in style.

University College, one of seven colleges at the University of Toronto, is an example of the Romanesque Revival style. Construction of the final design began on 4 October 1856.

Sweden

The Vasa Church in Gothenburg, Sweden, is another prime example of the Neo-Romanesque style of architecture.

United States
The Church of the Pilgrims—now the Maronite Cathedral of Our Lady of Lebanon—in Brooklyn Heights, Brooklyn, designed by Richard Upjohn and built 1844–46, is generally considered the first work of Romanesque Revival architecture in the United States. It was soon followed by a more prominent design for the Smithsonian Institution Building in Washington, DC, designed by James Renwick Jr. and built 1847–51.  Renwick allegedly submitted two proposals to the design competition, one Gothic and the other Romanesque in the style.  The Smithsonian chose the latter, which was based on designs from German architecture books.
Several concurrent forces contributed to the popularizing of the Romanesque Revival in the United States.  The first was an influx of German immigrants in the 1840s, who brought the style of the Rundbogenstil with them. Second, a series of works on the style was published concurrently with the earliest built examples.  The first of these, Hints on Public Architecture, written by social reformer Robert Dale Owen in 1847–48, was prepared for the Building Committee of the Smithsonian Institution and prominently featured illustrations of Renwick's Smithsonian Institution Building.  Owen argued that Greek Revival architecture—then the prevailing style in the United States for everything from churches to banks to private residences—was unsuitable as a national American style.  He maintained that the Greek temples upon which the style was based had neither the windows, chimneys, nor stairs required by modern buildings, and that the low-pitched temple roofs and tall colonnades were ill-adapted to cold northern climates. To Owen, most Greek Revival buildings thus lacked architectural truth, because they attempted to hide 19th-century necessities behind classical temple facades. In its place, he offered that the Romanesque style was ideal for a more flexible and economic American architecture.

Soon after, the Congregational Church published A Book of Plans for Churches and Parsonages in 1853, containing 18 designs by 10 architects, including Upjohn, Renwick, Henry Austin, and Gervase Wheeler, most in the Romanesque Revival style. Richard Salter Storrs and other clergy on the book's committee were members or frequent preachers of Upjohn's Church of the Pilgrims.
St. Joseph Church in Hammond, Indiana, is Romanesque Revival.

The most celebrated "Romanesque Revival" architect of the late 19th century was H. H. Richardson, whose mature style was so individual that it is known as "Richardsonian Romanesque". Among his most prominent buildings are Trinity Church (Boston) and Sever Hall and Austin Hall at Harvard University.

Basilica of the National Shrine of the Immaculate Conception 
The Basilica of the National Shrine of the Immaculate Conception is a large Catholic minor basilica and national shrine located in Washington, D.C., United States of America.
The shrine is the largest Catholic church in North America, one of the largest churches in the world, and the tallest habitable building in Washington, D.C. Its construction of Byzantine Revival and Romanesque Revival architecture began on September 23, 1920, with renowned contractor John McShain and was completed on December 8, 2017, with the dedication and solemn blessing of the Trinity Dome mosaic on December 8, 2017, the Feast of the Immaculate Conception, by Cardinal Donald William Wuerl.

Gallery

See also

 Alexander Brown House, Syracuse, New York
 Gothic Revival architecture
 Museum of Early Trades and Crafts
 Romanesque Revival architecture in the United Kingdom
 Richardsonian Romanesque
 Rundbogenstil
 Venetian Gothic

References

 
Revival architectural styles
19th-century architectural styles
20th-century architectural styles